1950 in the Philippines details events of note that happened in the Philippines in 1950.

Incumbents

 President: Elpidio Quirino (Liberal) 
 Vice President: Fernando Lopez (Liberal) 
 Chief Justice: Manuel Moran
 Congress: 2nd

Events

June
 June 15 – Cagayan de Oro in the province of Misamis Oriental becomes a city through Republic Act 521 and ratified on the same day.
 June 16 – Iligan becomes a city in the province of Lanao del Norte through Republic Act 525 and ratified on the same day.

July
 July 24 – Cabanatuan becomes a city in the province of Nueva Ecija through Republic Act 526 and ratified on the same day.

August
 August 2 – Butuan becomes a city in the province of Agusan del Norte through Republic Act 523 and ratified on the same day.
 August 31 – President Quirino appoints Ramon Magsaysay as Secretary of the Department of National Defense.

September
 September 30 – Marawi becomes a city in the province of Lanao del Norte through Republic Act 592 and ratified on the same day.

November
 November 15 – The province of Mindoro is dissolved after splitting into two provinces. The provinces of Occidental Mindoro and Oriental Mindoro are founded through the date of effectivity of Proclamation No. 186.

Holidays

As per Act No. 2711 section 29, issued on March 10, 1917, any legal holiday of fixed date falls on Sunday, the next succeeding day shall be observed as legal holiday. Sundays are also considered legal religious holidays. Bonifacio Day was added through Philippine Legislature Act No. 2946. It was signed by then-Governor General Francis Burton Harrison in 1921. On October 28, 1931, the Act No. 3827 was approved declaring the last Sunday of August as National Heroes Day.

 January 1 – New Year's Day
 February 22 – Legal Holiday
 March 29 – Maundy Thursday
 March 30 – Good Friday
 May 1 – Labor Day
 July 4 – Philippine Republic Day
 August 13  – Legal Holiday
 August 27  – National Heroes Day
 November 22 – Thanksgiving Day
 November 30 – Bonifacio Day
 December 25 – Christmas Day
 December 30 – Rizal Day

Births

 January 7 – Lou Veloso, Filipino actor, comedian, and politician
 January 10 – Nicanor Perlas, Filipino activist
 February 1 – Romulo Neri, Filipino educator and public servant
 February 20 – Libran N. Cabactulan, Filipino diplomat from the Republic of the Philippines,
 February 28 – Jaime Fabregas, Filipino multi-awarded actor and musical scorer in the Philippines of Spanish descent.
 March 7 – Leo Martinez, Filipino actor/comedian and director.
 March 10 – Billy Bibit, Filipino retired colonel (died 2009)
 March 18 – Celeste Legaspi, Filipino singer and actress.
 March 19 – Jose S. Palma, Archbishop of Cebu
 March 23 – Roy Alvarez, filmmaker (died 2014)
 March 25 – Elpidio Barzaga, Jr., Filipino politician and Governor of Cavite
 March 29 – Tina Monzon-Palma, Filipino news anchorwoman.
 April 5 – Agnes Devanadera, Filipino politician
 April 12 – Ricky Reyes, Hairdresser
 April 25 – Apollo C. Quiboloy, founder and leader of the Philippines-based Restorationist church, the Kingdom of Jesus Christ, The Name Above Every Name, Inc.
 May 16 – Mike Bigornia Filipino poet, editor, fictionist and translator.
 May 18 – Butch Ramirez, sports official
 June 5 – Abraham Sarmiento, Jr., Filipino student journalist (died 1977)
 June 20 - Prospero Pichay, Jr., Philippine politician
 July 13 – Abdusakur Mahail Tan, Filipino politician
 July 29 – Cynthia Villar, Filipino politician
 August 27 – Pen Medina, Filipino actor
 August 31 – Rey Paz Contreras, Filipino artist
 September 11 – Jovito Palparan, Filipino retired Army general, and anti-communist.
 September 23 – Saidamen Balt Pangarungan, businessman, lawyer, and politician.
 October 10 – Roberto Cajes, Filipino politician
 October 12 – Pilar Pilapil, Filipino actress.
 October 22 – Velma Veloria
 October 24 – Iggy Arroyo, Filipino politician. (died 2012)
 October 31 – Antonio Taguba, retired major general in the United States Army.
 November 16 – Manuel Zamora - Filipino Politician
 December 2 – Maximo Junta, Filipino cyclist.
 December 10 – Leo Soriano, bishop of the United Methodist Church

Unknown
Oscar Hilman, Filipino American brigadier general
Quinito Henson, Filipino sports analyst

Death
 May 28 - Vicente Sotto, Filipino politician and former senator of the Philippines (born 1877)

References